Alan Fetterman is an American plein air impressionist oil painter from Bucks County in Pennsylvania. He began painting in earnest after a trip to the Louvre Museum in Paris, France, when he was 35 years old.

Early life and education 
Fetterman was born September 8, 1958 to a military family,[3] moving to Bucks County in 1963. Alan graduated from Central Bucks East High School in 1976. 
He has a degree in American Studies from Bucks County Community College, earned in 1998. He is a Kay Scholar in Philosophy from the University of Pennsylvania, earned in 2008. Before becoming a painter Fetterman worked in construction. He traveled all over the world, from Europe to South America, learning about the different cultures and sketching what he saw. In 1988, while visiting Paris, he realized his calling after spending ten hours in the Louvre.

Philadelphia Sketch Club's Medal of Honor 
October 21, 2017 Fetterman was awarded the Philadelphia Sketch Club Medal of Honor for Excellence and Contribution to the Arts.

Bucks County's First Artist Residence 
On March 26, 2018 Alan Fetterman was sworn in as Bucks County's First Artist Residence.

Central Bucks Chamber of Commerce Lifetime Achievement Award 
On April 8, 2017 Central Bucks Chamber of Commerce presented its Lifetime Achievement Award to Alan Fetterman for representing the best of the best in Bucks County for his humanitarian efforts and ambassadorship in the arts.

The Heritage Conservancy "Wind in the Willows" 
In November 2017 The Heritage Conservancy opened its Aldie Mansion headquarters to an exhibit of Fetterman art works re-imagining the classic 1908 Victorian classic children's book "The Wind in the Willows," by Kenneth Grahame. Fetterman's paintings and drawings took the classic characters out of their original Thames Valley setting and transported them to Bucks County, Pennsylvania.

"Making an Impression" Suburban Life Magazine 
October 2015 Fetterman was profiled for his in Philadelphia Suburban Life Magazine. "Fetterman has been featured in more than 30 solo exhibitions and has showcased various creations in more than 150 art galleries in places diverse as Carmel-by-the-Sea, Calif.; Curitiba, Brazil; and Vero Beach, Fla. Additionally, his work can be found in some of the finest art collections in the Delaware Valley region, both private and public. Look for two large Fetterman original classics at Doylestown Hospital in the main lobby—“Doylestown at the Turn,”  purchased more than 15 years ago, and “Waterways,” which is hung in bookend fashion highlighting juxtaposition and balance. At Bucks County Community College in Newtown, viewers will find a large sparkling night scene in the new Linksz Pavilion. The painting, “Spring Valley Eve,” captures the classic snow-covered evenings for which Bucks County has become famous. And there's the grand-scale painting “The Land We Love” depicting a vast vista of hills and dales in upper Bucks County, which can be seen in the great room at the Heritage Conservancy in the Aldie Mansion. Adding to his list of public works is “Strength of Liberty,” a sculpture recently installed on the fourth floor of the new Bucks County Justice Center in Doylestown. The piece, which will stand in perpetuity, is a powerful yet sensitive melding of stainless steel, brass, glass and gold.  Most recently, his paintings were purchased and hung in the Eisenhower House at Gettysburg College, where President Dwight D. Eisenhower wrote his memoirs."

References 

1958 births
Living people
American landscape painters
Painters from Pennsylvania
American male painters
20th-century American painters
University of Pennsylvania alumni
20th-century American male artists